was a Japanese mathematician who worked with partial differential equations, mathematical physics and functional analysis.

Kato studied physics and received his undergraduate degree in 1941 at the Imperial University of Tokyo. After disruption of the Second World War, he received his doctorate in 1951 from the University of Tokyo, where he became a professor in 1958. From 1962, he worked as a professor at the University of California at Berkeley in the United States.

Many works of Kato are related to mathematical physics. In 1951, he showed the self-adjointness of Hamiltonians for realistic (singular) potentials. He dealt with nonlinear evolution equations, the Korteweg–de Vries equation (Kato smoothing effect in 1983) and with solutions of the Navier-Stokes equation. Kato is also known for his influential book Perturbation theory of linear operators, published by Springer-Verlag.

In 1980, he won the Norbert Wiener Prize in Applied Mathematics from AMS and SIAM. In 1970, he gave a plenary lecture at the ICM in Nice (scattering theory and perturbation of continuous spectra).

Publications 
 Perturbation theory of linear operators. Principles of Mathematical Sciences, Springer-Verlag, 1966, 1976.
 A short introduction to the perturbation theory of linear operators. Springer-Verlag 1982.

See also
Lie product formula
Weyl–von Neumann theorem

References

External links
 

20th-century Japanese mathematicians
Mathematical physicists
People from Tochigi Prefecture
Academic staff of the University of Tokyo
University of California, Berkeley College of Letters and Science faculty
University of Tokyo alumni
1917 births
1999 deaths
PDE theorists
Operator theorists